
Gmina Lipsk is an urban-rural gmina (administrative district) in Augustów County, Podlaskie Voivodeship, in north-eastern Poland, on the border with Belarus.

Villages
Apart from the town of Lipsk, Gmina Lipsk contains the villages and settlements of Bartniki, Dolinczany, Dulkowszczyzna, Jaczniki, Jałowo, Jasionowo, Kolonie Lipsk, Kopczany, Krasne, Kurianka, Lichosielce, Lipsk Murowany, Lipszczany, Lubinowo, Nowe Leśne Bohatery, Nowy Lipsk, Nowy Rogożyn, Podwołkuszne, Rakowicze, Rogożynek, Rygałówka, Siółko, Skieblewo, Sołojewszczyzna, Stare Leśne Bohatery, Starożyńce, Stary Rogożyn, Wołkusz, Wyżarne and Żabickie.

Neighbouring gminas
Gmina Lipsk is bordered by the gminas of Dąbrowa Białostocka, Nowy Dwór, Płaska and Sztabin. It also borders Belarus.

References

Lipsk
Augustów County